The 1966 NCAA University Division Cross Country Championships were the 28th annual cross country meet to determine the team and individual national champions of men's collegiate cross country running in the United States. Held on November 21, 1966, the meet was hosted for the second straight year by the University of Kansas at Rim Rock Farm in Lawrence, Kansas. The distance for this race was 6 miles (9.7 kilometers).

All NCAA University Division members were eligible to qualify for the meet. In total, 25 teams and 189 individual runners contested this championship.

The team national championship was won by the Villanova Wildcats, their first team title. The individual championship was won by Gerry Lindgren, from Washington State, with a time of 29:01.04. Lindgren's time set the new event distance record, breaking the record set the previous year by John Lawson. Lindgren's time would hold until 1969, when he himself would break it during his senior year.

Men's title
Distance: 6 miles (9.7 kilometers)

Team Result (Top 10)

See also
NCAA Men's Division II Cross Country Championship

References
 

NCAA Cross Country Championships
NCAA University Division Cross Country Championships
NCAA University Division Cross Country Championships
NCAA University Division Cross Country Championships 
Lawrence, Kansas
Track and field in Kansas
University of Kansas
Sports competitions in Kansas
College sports in Kansas